Lo que el cielo no perdona (English title: What heaven will not forgive) is a Mexican telenovela produced by Fernando Chacón for Canal de las Estrellas in 1982. It starred by Blanca Guerra, Enrique Álvarez Félix, Mónica Prado, Rosa María Moreno and the child Luis Mario Quiroz.

Plot 
Toño is a nice boy orphan who, along with his faithful dog Simon decides to travel to the big city, then discovers that his real father lives there, so it's really not an orphan. Discover this is a very rich man but he's really sick. Wicked relatives know that the child will inherit all when the father dies, so to get to the house of his father treat them badly and posing as the son of the maid, but at all costs want rid of it. But Toño find support and affection in Elizabeth, a young woman who cares for and protects like his own son.

Marcelo is a man who also mistreated the child, but to fall in love with Isabel changes and becomes attached to the child. The father dies and Marcelo learns that relatives want to kidnap the child. There he defends and takes it out of the house, but this causes Marcelo is kidnapped and ends up dead. Toño flee with Isabel and Simon but after so many misfortunes finally recover what belongs.

Cast 
 Enrique Álvarez Félix as Marcelo
 Blanca Guerra as Isabel
 Luis Mario Quiroz as Toño
 Mónica Prado as Martha
 Rosa María Moreno as Serafina
 Xavier Marc as Gerardo
 Ana Silvia Garza as Bárbara
 Sara Guasch as Prudencia
 Patricia Montero as Leonor
 Adriana Parra as Teodosia
 Merle Uribe as Rebeca
 Alberto Sayán as Luis Alvarado
 Queta Carrasco as Milagros
 Oscar Traven as Reynaldo
 Margot Wagner as Remedios
 Carlos Riquelme as Don Andrés

References

External links 

1982 telenovelas
Mexican telenovelas
1982 Mexican television series debuts
1982 Mexican television series endings
Spanish-language telenovelas
Television shows set in Mexico City
Televisa telenovelas